Frank R. Grey was an English illustrator, best remembered for his illustration of Jane Turpin stories by Evadne Price. He was with the publishing house of Robert Hale, Ltd. and illustrated all ten collections of Jane stories published by Robert Hale. The 1985 collection of Jane stories - Jane and Co published by Macmillan also uses his illustrations.

Frank R. Grey also produced a lot of work for British magazines of various profiles. His work was published extensively in the 1920s and 1930s, starting as early as 1914. Among the wide range of magazines for which he produced works were :
Punch, Chums, The Scout, Boy's Own Paper, Windsor Magazine, Illustrated Sporting and Dramatic News, and The Dreadnought. His work was also published in several short story compilations and reference books. Grey was also a member of the Kathleen Boland Studio, an illustration agency presently known as Illustration.

Jane stories were published by three publishing houses over time (John Hamilton, Newnes, and Robert Hale), and each publishing house employed their own illustrator, who portrayed Jane Turpin in different ways. Newnes employed the noted illustrator of William Brown books - Thomas Henry. However, the depiction of Jane Turpin by Grey is the most popular one, and the image of the angelic looking, golden haired girl with curls actually influenced Evadne Price's descriptions of Jane. Grey used watercolours for cover art and a hatch style of illustration on the Jane books.

Grey also published an illustrated comic booklet called "The Low-Down on Flying", with 11 humorous illustrations on flying. Published between the World Wars, the booklet was sponsored by the tailors Moss Brothers of Covent Garden, and also served as an advertisement for them.

Selected bibliography

The Wonderland of Knowledge, Ernest Ogan (ed.), Odhams Press, London - c. 1933 (co-illustrator of the 120 odd colour plates in the 12 volumes)
My Lord Goes Wayfaring, by Moyra Charlton, Methuen, London - 1935
Just Jane, by Evadne Price, Robert Hale Ltd, London - 1937
Meet Jane, by Evadne Price, Robert Hale Ltd, London - 1937
Enter - Jane, by Evadne Price, Robert Hale Ltd, London - 1937
Jane the Fourth, by Evadne Price, Robert Hale Ltd, London - 1937*
Jane the Sleuth, by Evadne Price, Robert Hale Ltd, London - 1939*
Jane the Unlucky, by Evadne Price, Robert Hale Ltd, London - 1939*
Jane the Popular, by Evadne Price, Robert Hale Ltd, London - 1939*
Jane the Patient, by Evadne Price, Robert Hale Ltd, London - 1940*
Jane Gets Busy, by Evadne Price, Robert Hale Ltd, London - 1940*
Jane at War, by Evadne Price, Robert Hale Ltd, London - 1947*
Jack Archer: A Tale of the Crimea, by G. A. Henty, Latimer House, London - 1955
Black Beauty, by Anna Sewell, Collins, London - 1962
Jane and Co, by Evadne Price, Macmillan Publishers, London - 1985
Great Ghost Stories, Chancellor Press, London - 2002

NB: Asterisks denote first editions

External links
 
 

English illustrators